A tie line, also known as a tie trunk, is a telecommunication circuit between two telephone exchanges or two extensions of a private telephone system.

See also
Private branch exchange
Circuit ID
Leased line
Private line

References

Communication circuits